Windows NT 4.0 is a major release of the Windows NT operating system developed by Microsoft and oriented towards businesses. It is the direct successor to Windows NT 3.51, and was released to manufacturing on July 31, 1996, and then to retail on August 24, 1996. It was Microsoft's primary business-oriented operating system until the introduction of Windows 2000. Workstation, server and embedded editions were sold, and all editions feature a graphical user interface similar to that of Windows 95, which was superseded by Windows 98 and could still be directly upgraded by either Windows 2000 Professional or Windows Me.

Mainstream support for Windows NT 4.0 Workstation ended on June 30, 2002, following by extended support ending on June 30, 2004. Windows NT 4.0 Server mainstream support ended on December 31, 2002, with extended support ending on December 31, 2004. Windows NT 4.0 Embedded mainstream support ended on June 30, 2003, followed by extended support on July 11, 2006, with Windows 98 and Windows Me ending support on that date as well. These editions were succeeded by Windows 2000 Professional, the Windows 2000 Server Family and Windows XP Embedded, respectively.

Windows NT 4.0 is the last public release of Windows for the Alpha, MIPS, and PowerPC architectures.

Overview
The successor to Windows NT 3.51, Windows NT 4.0 introduced the user interface of Windows 95 to the Windows NT family, including the Windows shell, File Explorer (known as Windows NT Explorer at the time), and the use of "My" nomenclature for shell folders (e.g. My Computer). It also includes most components introduced with Windows 95. Internally, Windows NT 4.0 was known as the Shell Update Release (SUR). While many administrative tools, notably User Manager for Domains, Server Manager and Domain Name Service Manager still used the old graphical user interfaces, the Start menu in Windows NT 4.0 separated the per-user shortcuts and folders from the shared shortcuts and folders by a separator line. Windows NT 4.0 includes some enhancements from Microsoft Plus! for Windows 95 such as the Space Cadet pinball table, font smoothing, showing window contents while dragging, high-color icons and stretching the wallpaper to fit the screen. Windows Desktop Update could also be installed on Windows NT 4.0 to update the shell version and install Task Scheduler. Windows NT 4.0 Resource Kit included the Desktop Themes utility.

Windows NT 4.0 is a preemptively multitasked, 32-bit operating system that is designed to work with either uniprocessor or symmetric multi-processor computers.

Windows NT 4.0 is the last major release of Microsoft Windows to support the Alpha, MIPS or PowerPC CPU architectures as Windows 2000 runs solely on IA-32 only. It remained in use by businesses for a number of years, despite Microsoft's many efforts to get customers to upgrade to Windows 2000 and newer versions. It was also the last release in the Windows NT family to be branded as Windows NT although Windows 2000 carried the designation "Built on NT Technology".

Features
Although the chief enhancement has been the addition of the Windows 95 shell, there are several major performance, scalability and feature improvements to the core architecture, kernel, USER32, COM and MSRPC. Windows NT 4.0 also introduced the concept of system policies and the System Policy Editor.

Other important features were:

 Crypto API
 Telephony API 2.0 with limited Unimodem support, which was the first release of TAPI on Windows NT
 DCOM and new OLE features
 Microsoft Transaction Server for network applications
 Microsoft Message Queuing (MSMQ), which improved interprocess communication
 Winsock 2 and the TCP/IP stack improvements
 File system defragmentation support
The server editions of Windows NT 4.0 include Internet Information Services 2.0, Microsoft FrontPage 1.1, NetShow Services, Remote Access Service (which includes a PPTP server for VPN functionality) and Multi-Protocol Routing service. There are new administrative wizards and a lite version of the Network Monitor utility shipped with System Management Server. The Enterprise edition introduced Microsoft Cluster Server.

One significant difference from previous versions of Windows NT is that the Graphics Device Interface (GDI) is moved into kernel mode rather than being in user mode in the CSRSS process. This eliminated a process-to-process context switch in calling GDI functions, resulting in a significant performance improvement over Windows NT 3.51, particularly in the graphical user interface. This, however, also mandated that graphics and printer drivers had to run in kernel mode as well, resulting in potential stability issues.

Windows NT 4.0 was the first release of Microsoft Windows to include DirectX as standard—version 2 shipped with the initial release of Windows NT 4.0, and version 3 was included with the release of Service Pack 3 in mid-1997. However advanced hardware accelerated Direct3D and DirectSound multimedia features were never available on Windows NT 4.0. Later versions of DirectX were not released for Windows NT 4.0. However, OpenGL was supported; it was used by Quake 3 and Unreal Tournament.

In early releases of 4.0, numerous stability issues did occur as graphics and printer vendors had to change their drivers to be compatible with the kernel mode interfaces exported by GDI. The change to move the GDI to run in the same process context as its caller was prompted by complaints from NT Workstation users about real-time graphics performance, but this change put a considerable onus on hardware manufacturers to update device drivers.

Windows NT 4.0 also included a new Windows Task Manager utility. Previous versions of Windows NT included the Task List utility, but it only shows applications currently on the desktop. To monitor CPU and memory usage, users were forced to use Performance Monitor. The task manager offers a more convenient way of getting a snapshot of all the processes running on the system at any given time.

Internet Explorer 2 was bundled with Windows NT 4. The installation of Internet Explorer 4 on Windows NT 4.0 (Service Pack 3 or later) gave Windows NT 4.0 Active Desktop and browser integration into Windows Explorer, known as the Windows Desktop Update.

Windows NT 4.0 upgraded NTVDM's x86 emulation in the RISC versions from 286 to 486. Sysprep was introduced as a deployment tool with Windows NT 4.0.

Comparison with Windows 95
Windows NT 4.0, like previous versions of Windows NT before it and versions after it, is a fully 32-bit OS, while Windows 95 is a 16/32-bit hybrid OS.

While providing much greater stability than Windows 95, Windows NT 4.0 was less flexible from a desktop perspective. Much of the stability was gained through the use of protected memory and the hardware abstraction layer. Direct hardware access was disallowed and "misbehaving" programs were terminated without needing the computer to be restarted. The trade-off was that NT required much more memory (32 MB for normal desktop use, 128 MB or more for heavy 3D applications) in comparison to consumer targeted products such as Windows 95.

While nearly all programs written for Windows 95 run on Windows NT, many 3D games would not, partly because of limited DirectX support for Windows NT 4.0. Third-party device drivers were an alternative to access the hardware directly, but poorly written drivers became a frequent source of the infamous error known as the Blue Screen of Death (BSoD) that would require the system to be restarted.

In spite of shipping a year later than Windows 95, by default there is no Legacy Plug and Play support and no Device Manager on Windows NT 4.0, which greatly simplifies installation of hardware devices (although limited support could be installed later). Many basic DOS programs would run; however, graphical DOS programs would not run because of the way they accessed graphics hardware. Although Windows NT 4.0 introduced an application programming interface (API) for defragmentation, there was no built-in defragmentation utility, unlike Windows 95. Also, Windows NT 4.0 lacked USB support, a preliminary version of which would be added to OEM editions of Windows 95 in OSR 2.1.

The difference between the NT family and 9x family would remain until the release of Windows XP in 2001. At that time, the APIs — such as OpenGL and DirectX — had matured sufficiently to be more efficient to write for common PC hardware, and the hardware itself had become powerful enough to handle the API processing overhead.

The maximum amount of supported physical random-access memory (RAM) in Windows NT 4.0 is 4 GB, which is the maximum possible for a 32-bit operating system that does not support PAE. By comparison, Windows 95 fails to boot on computers with more than approximately 480 MB of memory.

Like previous versions of NT, version 4.0 can run on multiple processor architectures. Windows 95, however, can only run on x86.

Editions

Windows NT 4.0 Server was included in versions 4.0 and 4.5 of BackOffice Small Business Server suite.

Client
 Windows NT 4.0 Workstation was designed for use as the general business desktop operating system.

Servers
 Windows NT 4.0 Server, released in 1996, was designed for small-scale business server systems.
 Windows NT 4.0 Server, Enterprise Edition, released in 1997, is the precursor to the Enterprise line of the Windows server family (Advanced Server in Windows 2000). Enterprise Server was designed for high-demand, high-traffic networks. Windows NT 4.0 Server, Enterprise Edition includes Service Pack 3. The Enterprise Edition saw the introduction of the  boot flag, which changed the default virtual address space mapping from 2 GB kernel and 2 GB user space to 1 GB kernel and 3 GB userland. This version also sees the first introduction of cluster service.
 Windows NT 4.0 Terminal Server Edition, released in 1998, allows the users to log on remotely. The same functionality was called Terminal Services in Windows 2000 and later server releases, and also powers the Remote Desktop feature that first appeared in Windows XP and later versions of Windows. Windows NT 4.0 Terminal Server Edition, like Windows NT 4.0 Server, Enterprise Edition, includes Service Pack 3.

Embedded
 Windows NT 4.0 Embedded (abbreviated NTe) is an edition of Windows NT 4.0 that was aimed at computer-powered major appliances, vending machines, ATMs and other devices that cannot be considered general-purpose computers per se. It is the same system as the standard Windows NT 4.0, but it comes packaged in a database of components and dependencies, from which a developer can choose individual components to build customized setup CDs and hard disk boot images. Windows NT 4.0 Embedded includes Service Pack 5. It was succeeded by Windows XP Embedded. Microsoft ended mainstream support for Windows NT 4.0 Embedded on June 30, 2003, and received three years of extended support, which means that support for Windows NT 4.0 Embedded ended on the same day support for Windows 98 and Windows Me ended on July 11, 2006.

Upgradeability
An Option Pack was available as a free-bundled CD starting around 1998, which included IIS 4.0 with Active Server Pages, FrontPage Server Extensions, Certificate Server, MTS, MSMQ, CDONTS, Internet Authentication Service (IAS), Indexing Service, Microsoft Management Console 1.0, Microsoft Site Server, SMTP and NNTP services and other new software.

Several features such as Distributed File System and Windows NT Load Balancing Service (WLBS) were delivered as addons for Windows NT Server 4.0. The Routing and Remote Access Service was also a downloadable feature which replaced Windows NT 4.0's separate RAS and Multi-Protocol Routing services.

The last version of Microsoft Office to be compatible with Windows NT 4.0 is Office XP. Similarly, Windows Media Player 6.4 (which was released in April 1999) and DirectX 3.0a (which was released in December 1996) are the last versions of Windows Media Player and DirectX available for Windows NT 4.0, respectively. The last versions of .NET Framework and Windows Installer available for Windows NT 4.0 are .NET Framework 1.1 (released in April 2003) and Windows Installer 2.0 (released in September 2001), respectively. The last version of Internet Explorer supported on Windows NT 4.0 is Internet Explorer 6 with SP1, which was released in September 2002 (Service Pack 6a is required).

Windows NT 4.0 was succeeded by Windows 2000, which also included the Windows Desktop Update and Internet Explorer 5 by default. It also could be directly upgraded to Windows XP Professional on IA-32-based systems only.

Service packs

Windows NT 4.0 received seven service packs during its lifecycle, as well as numerous service rollup packages and option packs. Only the first service pack was made available for the MIPS architecture, Service Pack 2 was the final release for the PowerPC architecture, and Service Pack 6 was the final release for the Alpha architecture. Service Pack 6a (SP6a) is the last released service pack for Windows NT 4.0.

Service Pack 7 was planned at one stage in early 2001, but this became the Post SP6a Security Rollup and not a full service pack, released on July 26, 2001, 16 months following the release of Windows 2000 and nearly three months prior to the release of Windows XP.

In addition to bug fixes, the service packs also added a multitude of new features such as Ultra DMA mode for disk drives along with bus mastering, newer versions of Internet Information Services, user accounts and user profile improvements, smart card support, improved symmetric multiprocessing (SMP) scalability, clustering capabilities, COM support improvements, Event Log service, MS-CHAPv2 and NTLMv2, SMB packet signing, Syskey, boot improvements, WINS improvements, Routing and Remote Access Service (RRAS), PPTP, DCOM/HTTP tunneling improvements, IGMPv2, WMI, Active Accessibility and NTFS 3.0 support among others.

Resource Kits
Microsoft released five revisions of the Windows NT 4.0 Workstation and Server Resource Kit (original release plus four supplements) which contained a large number of tools and utilities, such as desktops.exe which allowed the user to have multiple desktops, as well as third-party software.

Security
Microsoft stopped providing security updates for Windows NT 4.0 Workstation on June 30, 2004, Windows NT 4.0 Server on December 31, 2004, and Windows NT 4.0 Embedded on July 11, 2006, due to major security flaws including Microsoft Security Bulletin MS03-010, which according to Microsoft could not be patched without significant changes to the core operating system. According to the security bulletin, "Due to the fundamental differences between Windows NT 4.0 and Windows 2000 and its successors, it is infeasible to rebuild the software for Windows NT 4.0 to eliminate the vulnerability. To do so would require re-architecting a very significant amount of the Windows NT 4.0 operating system, and there would be no assurance that applications designed to run on Windows NT 4.0 would continue to operate on the patched system."

Between June 2003 and June 2007, 127 security flaws were identified and patched in Windows 2000 Server, many of which may also affect Windows NT 4.0 Server; however, Microsoft does not test security bulletins against unsupported software.

References

External links
Guidebook: Windows NT 4.0 Gallery – A website dedicated to preserving and showcasing Graphical User Interfaces
HPC:Factor Windows NT 4.0 Workstation Patches & Updates Guide
HPC:Factor Windows NT 4.0 Server Patches & Updates Guide
Josephn.net: Windows NT 4.0 Terminal Server Edition Tips & Updates 
MDGx: Windows NT 4.0 Essential Free Upgrades + Fixes

1996 software
Products and services discontinued in 2006
4.0
IA-32 operating systems
MIPS operating systems
PowerPC operating systems